Wonderland is the second studio album by English pop rock band McFly. It was released in the United Kingdom on 29 August 2005, and was a success, being certified platinum, selling over 300,000 copies in the UK peaking at number 1 in the UK Albums Chart breaking the world record for the youngest band to top the album chart twice. Despite being less of a success in the UK, the album went on to match the worldwide sales of McFly's debut album Room on the 3rd Floor, selling over one million copies.

Background
The album contains production from early collaborator Hugh Padgham, who co-produced the majority of the band's debut album, as well as production from former Busted producer Steve Power. The album follows more of a story-like narrative than the band's first album, and adopts a slightly more advanced style of pop. Unlike the band's first album, there is no hidden track on the album. Four singles were released from the album: "All About You", which was released as the official Comic Relief single for 2005, "I'll Be OK", "I Wanna Hold You" and the double A-side of "Ultraviolet and The Ballad of Paul K". A deluxe version of the album was released in special gatefold packagaing, with fold-out photos of the band as well as an extended booklet. The Japanese edition of the album contains two additional tracks plus two music videos.

Critical reception
Sharon Mawer of AllMusic said of the album: "The often difficult second album was made to look easy by McFly, the four lads from London who saw Busted, their main rivals for the affections of pre-teenage hearts, split up in 2005, leaving them the only guitar-based pop band in town, and McFly did not disappoint their army of fans with Wonderland. At the time of release, it already contained two number one singles, "I'll Be OK" and the Comic Relief charity hit "All About You," although the Carly Simon/James Taylor B-side, track two on the CD single, "You've Got a Friend" was not included. The same mixture of good, fun 1960s-influenced pop songs and mid-tempo ballads is here, as on the debut album Room on the 3rd Floor, the opening track, "I'll Be OK," being a good example of a boy band trying to sound as little like a boy band as possible with real instruments, mainly guitars that, if you really stretched your imagination, on the intro could be compared to the Who's "Won't Get Fooled Again," although it only lasted about fifteen seconds. The boys even felt confident enough to include a sitar on the song "Ultraviolet," which became their least successful single release to date. The turning point of the album came about halfway through - on vinyl it would have been side two - with the "All About You" track, which opened with an orchestral piece and then continued throughout the song with a strummed acoustic guitar and even had a woodwind instrumental break. And of course, there was quite a memorable song in there as well. This theme was expanded even further on the two-part track "She Falls Asleep"—part one a dreamy instrumental heavy on the orchestral string section; part two a sophisticated ballad, quite dramatic in its production—and the album concluded as it began, with more guitar-led harmony pop with the songs "Nothing" and "Memory Lane". One might sneer, but Wonderland was a good album from an obviously talented group of young lads."

Track listing

Charts

Certifications

See also
The Wonderland Tour 2005

References

External links
McFly website

2005 albums
McFly albums
Island Records albums
Albums produced by Hugh Padgham